Salle Montansier may refer to:

 Théâtre Montansier (Versailles)
 Théâtre National (rue de la Loi)
 Théâtre du Palais Royal